John Richard Thomas (8 March 1897 – 4 July 1968) was a British Labour Party politician of Welsh provenance, and a Chartered Accountant.

He was elected as Member of Parliament (MP) for Dover at the 1945 general election, but did not contest the 1950 general election, when his seat was won by the Conservative candidate John Arbuthnot.

References

External links 
 

1897 births
1968 deaths
Labour Party (UK) MPs for English constituencies
UK MPs 1945–1950
Members of the Parliament of the United Kingdom for Dover